Annastacia Ndhlovu is a Zimbabwean politician from the Zimbabwe African National Union – Patriotic Front (ZANU–PF). She was Deputy Minister of Tourism and Hospitality from 2016 to 2019.

She was a member of the Generation 40 faction.

References 

Living people
20th-century births
Year of birth missing (living people)
Place of birth missing (living people)
Women government ministers of Zimbabwe
21st-century Zimbabwean politicians
21st-century Zimbabwean women politicians
ZANU–PF politicians